Athletics is one of the sports at the quadrennial Lusophone Games competition. It featured at the inaugural edition in 2006, and also the second edition of the Games in 2009.

In the 2009 Games, the half Marathon event was replaced by the 10,000 metres road race.

Editions

Men's champions

100 m
2009:  Francis Obikwelu
2006:  Jorge Sena

200 m
2009:  Arnaldo Abrantes
2006:  Bruno Barros Jr.

400 m
2009:  Eduardo Vasconcelos
2006:  Fernando Almeida

800 m
2009:  Lutimar Paes
2006:  Kleberson Davide

1500 m
2009:  Chaminda Wijekoon
2006:  Chaminda Wijekoon

5000 m
2009:  Manuel Damião
2006:  Sergio Silva

10,000 m road
2009:  Rui Pedro Silva

Half-Marathon
2006:  Nelson Cruz

110 m H
2009:  Anselmo Silva
2006:  Rodrigo Pereira

400 m H
2009:  Raphael Fernandes
2006:  Leonel Kurt

3000 m St.
2009:  Alberto Paulo
2006:  Pedro Ribeiro

High jump
2009:  Guilherme Cobbo
2006:  Fábio Baptista

Long jump
2009:  Marcos Chuva
2006:  Rogerio Bispo

Triple jump
2009:  Nelson Évora
2006:  Nelson Évora

Shot put
2009:  Marco Fortes
2006:  Marco Fortes

4 x 100m
2009: 
2006:

4 x 400 m
2009: 
2006:

Women's champions

100 m
2009:  Lucimar Moura
2006:   Susanthika Mannalage

200 m
2009:  Sónia Tavares
2006:  Susanthika Mannalage

400 m
2009:  Jailma Lima
2006:  Cristina Elaine

800 m
2009:  Sandra Teixeira
2006:  Leonor Piuza

1500 m
2009:  Jessica Augusto
2006:  Sandra Teixeira

5000 m
2009:  Sara Moreira
2006:  Sabine Heitling

10,000 m road
2009:  Fernanda Ribeiro

Half-Marathon
2006:  Mónica Silva

100 m H
2009:  Fabiana Moraes
2006:  Lucimara Silva

400 m H
2009:  Lucimar Teodoro
2006:  Amanda Dias

High jump
2009:  Lucimana Silva
2006:  Marisa Anselmo

Long jump
2009:  Naide Gomes
2006:  Tânia Silva

Triple jump
2009:  Patricia Mamona
2006:  Tânia Silva

Shot put
2009:  Elisangela Adriano
2006:  Kelly Medeiros

4 x 100 m
2009: 
2006:

4 x 400 m
2009: 
2006:

See also
List of Lusophone Games records in athletics

 
Athletics
Lusophony Games